Paul Christopher Smith (born 29 April 1975) is a former English cricketer.  Smith was a right-handed batsman who played primarily as a wicketkeeper.  He was born in Hillingdon, London.

Smith represented the Middlesex Cricket Board in a single List A match against Derbyshire Cricket Board in the 1st round of the 2003 Cheltenham & Gloucester Trophy which was held in 2002.  In his only List A match he was not required to bat and behind the stumps he made a single stumping.

References

External links
Paul Smith at Cricinfo
Paul Smith at CricketArchive

1975 births
Living people
People from Hillingdon
Cricketers from Greater London
English cricketers
Middlesex Cricket Board cricketers
Wicket-keepers